Pine Knot may refer to:

 Pine Knot (cabin), a cabin in Virginia owned by Theodore Roosevelt
 Pine Knot, Kentucky, U.S.
 Pine Knot Creek, Georgia, U.S.
 Camp Pine Knot, in the Adirondack Mountains of New York, U.S.
 Fatwood or pine knot, the heartwood of pine trees

See also
 
 Pine Knob (disambiguation)